Captain Careless is a 1928 American adventure film directed by Jerome Storm and written by Randolph Bartlett, Frank Howard Clark and Perry Murdock. The film stars Bob Steele, Mary Mayberry, Jack Donovan, Barney Furey, Murdock and Wilfrid North. The film was released on August 26, 1928, by Film Booking Offices of America.

Cast        
Bob Steele as Bob Gordon
Mary Mayberry as Ruth 
Jack Donovan as Ralph
Barney Furey as Medicine Man
Perry Murdock as Perry
Wilfrid North as John Forsythe

References

External links
 

1928 films
American adventure films
1928 adventure films
Film Booking Offices of America films
Films directed by Jerome Storm
American silent feature films
American black-and-white films
1920s English-language films
1920s American films
Silent adventure films